Adam I. Sandow is the chairman and founder of the Sandow Media company (stylized SANDOW) with brands in the beauty, design, fashion and luxury categories. Sandow founded his namesake business in 2003.

Early life and education
Sandow grew up in Miami, Florida and attended the University of Miami in nearby Coral Gables, Florida.

Career
In 1994, Sandow started a publishing business and launched a national consumer magazine, Honeymoon.  He sold this business in 1999. Later he joined and served as principal of the Internet start-up and wedding media company The Knot (now XO Group). The Knot had an IPO in 2000. He left The Knot in 2000 and founded Sandow Media the next year.

In 2005, he founded NewBeauty, a consumer magazine which publishes articles about beauty, ranging from products to cosmetic procedures. Sandow launched his company’s second magazine, Luxe Interiors + Design, in June. Introduced as a regional high-end shelter magazine in Colorado, Luxe has since expanded to 14 regional editions around the United States. The launch of Luxe was followed by TestTube, a beauty product sampling program, in 2006.

Much of the company’s growth has come through acquisitions. In 2008, SANDOW acquired finance magazine Worth from CurtCo Media. Two years later, the company added design industry trade magazine Interior Design and the Furniture Today Group, purchased from Reed Business Information. In 2011, acquisitions included global materials consultancy Material ConneXion and its sister business, creative management agency Culture + Commerce.

In 2012, Sandow bought Los Angeles retail brand Fred Segal.  The next year, Sandow’s company was named one of Florida Trend magazine’s Top 200 Largest Private Companies in Florida. The same year, Adam Sandow was inducted into The Florida Magazine Association’s Hall of Fame in recognition of his career achievements, influence within publishing and history of giving back to the industry via participation in industry associations or other voluntary and cooperative forms of service.

SANDOW sold Furniture Today in 2013 to FT Media Holdings, Inc.

In May 2014, Sandow brought in equity partner, Evolution Media Partners (Evolution), to expand Fred Segal into a global lifestyle brand. Sandow was the featured keynote speaker at the annual Florida Magazine Conference 2014.

Sandow introduced BeautyDNA, an online beauty product matching service, in summer 2014. As of 2017, Sandow has offices in New York City and South Florida.

References

Year of birth missing (living people)
Living people
University of Miami alumni